Blechnum is a genus of ferns. Two very different circumscriptions of the genus are used by different authors. In the Pteridophyte Phylogeny Group classification of 2016 (PPG I), Blechnum is one of 18 genera in the subfamily Blechnoideae of the family Blechnaceae, and has about 30 species. Other sources place many more species in the genus, with only two other genera in the subfamily. The genus then has about 250 species.

Species placed in Blechnum  by Plants of the World Online, which uses the broad circumscription, but transferred to other genera by the Checklist of Ferns and Lycophytes of the World, which uses the narrow circumscription, are listed below together with their alternative placement.

A
Blechnum acanthopodum T.C.Chambers & P.A.Farrant = Parablechnum acanthopodum (T.C.Chambers & P.A.Farrant) Gasper & Salino
Blechnum acutum (Desv.) Mett. = Lomaridium acutum (Desv.) Gasper & V.A.O.Dittrich
Blechnum aequatoriense A.Rojas = Austroblechnum aequatoriense (A.Rojas) Gasper & V.A.O.Dittrich
Blechnum × aggregatum (Colenso) Tindale = Austroblechnum × aggregatum (Colenso) Gasper & V.A.O.Dittrich
Blechnum amabile Makino = Struthiopteris amabilis (Makino) Ching
Blechnum ambiguum C.Presl = Parablechnum ambiguum (Kaulf. ex C.Presl) C.Presl
Blechnum andinum C.Chr. = Austroblechnum andinum (Baker) Gasper & V.A.O.Dittrich
Blechnum articulatum (F.Muell.) S.B.Andrews = Parablechnum articulatum (F.Muell.) Gasper & Salino
Blechnum ascendens A.Rojas = Austroblechnum ascendens (A.Rojas) Gasper & V.A.O.Dittrich
Blechnum asperum (Klotzsch) J.W.Sturm = Austroblechnum asperum (Klotzsch) Gasper & V.A.O.Dittrich
Blechnum atropurpureum A.R.Sm. = Parablechnum atropurpureum (A.R.Sm.) Gasper & Salino
Blechnum attenuatum (Sw.) Mett. = Lomaridium attenuatum (Sw.) Gasper & V.A.O.Dittrich
Blechnum auratum (Fée) R.M.Tryon & Stolze = Lomariocycas aurata (Fée) Gasper & A.R.Sm.
Blechnum austrocaledonicum Christenh. = Doodia gracilis Copel.

B
Blechnum bakeri C.Chr. = Austroblechnum bakeri (C.Chr.) Gasper & V.A.O.Dittrich
Blechnum banksii (Hook.f.) Mett. = Austroblechnum banksii (Hook. fil.) Gasper & V.A.O.Dittrich
Blechnum bicolor M.Kessler & A.R.Sm. = Parablechnum bicolor (M.Kessler & A.R.Sm.) Gasper & Salino
Blechnum biforme (Baker) Christ = Lomaridium biforme (Baker) Gasper & V.A.O.Dittrich
Blechnum binervatum (Poir.) C.V.Morton & Lellinger = Lomaridium binervatum (Poir.) Gasper & V.A.O.Dittrich
Blechnum binerve (Hook.) C.Chr. = Lomaridium xiphophyllum (Baker) Gasper & V.A.O.Dittrich
Blechnum bolivianum M.Kessler & A.R.Sm. = Parablechnum bolivianum (M.Kessler & A.R.Sm.) Gasper & Salino
Blechnum bonapartei Rakotondr. = Lomaridium bonapartei (Rakotondr.) Gasper & V.A.O.Dittrich
Blechnum brackenridgei (Carruth.) Perrie & Brownsey = Doodia brackenridgei Carruth.
Blechnum brasiliense Desv. = Neoblechnum brasiliense (Desv.) Gasper & V.A.O.Dittrich
Blechnum bruneum M.Kessler & A.R.Sm. = Lomaria brunea (M.Kessler & A.R.Sm.) Gasper & V.A.O.Dittrich

C
Blechnum camfieldii Tindale = Parablechnum camfieldii (Tindale) Gasper & Salino
Blechnum capense Burm.f. = Parablechnum capense (Burm. fil.) Gasper & Salino
Blechnum cartilagineum Sw. = Oceaniopteris cartilaginea (Sw.) Gasper & Salino
Blechnum castaneum (Makino) Makino & Nemoto = Struthiopteris castanea (Makino) Nakai
Blechnum chambersii Tindale = Austroblechnum lanceolatum (R.Br.) Gasper & V.A.O.Dittrich
Blechnum chauliodontum Copel. = Parablechnum chauliodontum (Copel.) Gasper & Salino
Blechnum chiriquanum (Broadh.) C.Chr. = Parablechnum chiriquanum (Broadh.) Gasper & Salino
Blechnum christii C.Chr. = Parablechnum christii (C.Chr.) Gasper & Salino
Blechnum cochabambense M.Kessler & A.R.Sm. = Parablechnum cochabambense (M.Kessler & A.R.Sm.) Gasper & Salino
Blechnum colensoi (Hook.f.) N.A.Wakef. = Austroblechnum colensoi (Hook. fil.) Gasper & V.A.O.Dittrich
Blechnum columbiense Hieron. = Lomariocycas columbiensis (Hieron.) Gasper & A.R.Sm.
Blechnum confusum (Fourn.) Brownlie = Parablechnum confusum (E.Fourn.) Gasper & Salino
Blechnum contiguum Mett. = Lomaridium contiguum (Mett.) Gasper & V.A.O.Dittrich
Blechnum corbassonii Brownlie = Parablechnum corbassonii (Brownlie) Gasper & Salino
Blechnum cordatum (Desv.) Hieron. = Parablechnum cordatum (Desv.) Gasper & Salino
Blechnum corralense Espinosa = Austroblechnum corralense (Espinosa) Gasper & V.A.O.Dittrich
Blechnum cyatheoides (Kaulf.) Christenh. = Sadleria cyatheoides Kaulf.
Blechnum cycadifolium (Colla) J.W.Sturm = Lomariocycas cycadifolia (Colla) Gasper & A.R.Sm.

D
Blechnum decrescens Rakotondr. = Lomariocycas decrescens (Rakotondr.) Gasper & A.R.Sm.
Blechnum dendrophilum (Sodiro) C.Chr. = Lomaridium dendrophilum (Sodiro) Gasper & V.A.O.Dittrich
Blechnum difforme Copel. = Austroblechnum difforme (Copel.) Gasper & V.A.O.Dittrich
Blechnum dilatatum (Brause) T.C.Chambers & P.A.Farrant = Parablechnum dilatatum (T.C.Chambers & P.A.Farrant) Gasper & Salino
Blechnum discolor (Forst.) Keyserl. = Lomaria discolor (G.Forst.) Willd.
Blechnum dissectum (Parris) Christenh. = Doodia dissecta Parris
Blechnum divergens (Kunze) Mett. = Austroblechnum divergens (Kunze) Gasper & V.A.O.Dittrich
Blechnum diversifolium Mett. = Diploblechnum diversifolium (Mett.) Gasper & V.A.O.Dittrich
Blechnum dives (Kunze) Christenh. = Doodia dives Kunze
Blechnum doodianum Christenh. = Doodia heterophylla (F.M.Bailey) Domin
Blechnum durum (T.Moore) C.Chr. = Austroblechnum durum (T.Moore) Gasper & V.A.O.Dittrich

E–F
Blechnum eburneum Christ = Cleistoblechnum eburneum (Christ) Gasper & Salino
Blechnum egregium Copel. = Oceaniopteris egregia (Copel.) Gasper & Salino
Blechnum ensiforme (Liebm.) C.Chr. = Lomaridium ensiforme (Liebm.) Gasper & V.A.O.Dittrich
Blechnum falciforme (Liebm.) C.Chr. = Parablechnum falciforme (Liebm.) Gasper & Salino
Blechnum fernandezianum (Looser) Prada & Rolleri = Austroblechnum fernandezianum (Looser) Gasper & V.A.O.Dittrich
Blechnum filiforme (A.Cunn.) Ettingsh. = Icarus filiformis (A.Cunn.) Gasper & Salino
Blechnum finlaysonianum Wall. ex Hook. & Grev. = Blechnopsis finlaysoniana (Wall. ex Hook. & Grev.) C.Presl
Blechnum floresii C.Chr. = Austroblechnum divergens (Kunze) Gasper & V.A.O.Dittrich
Blechnum fluviatile (R.Br.) Lowe = Cranfillia fluviatilis (R.Br.) Gasper & V.A.O.Dittrich
Blechnum fragile (Liebm.) C.V.Morton & Lellinger = Lomaridium fragile (Liebm.) Gasper & V.A.O.Dittrich
Blechnum francii Rosenst. = Oceaniopteris francii (Rosenst.) Gasper & Salino
Blechnum fraseri (A.Cunn.) Luerss. = Diploblechnum fraseri (A.Cunn.) De Vol
Blechnum fullagari (F.Muell.) C.Chr. = Cranfillia fullagari (T.C.Chambers & P.A.Farrant) Gasper & V.A.O.Dittrich
Blechnum fuscosquamosum A.Rojas = Lomaridium fuscosquamosum (A.Rojas) Gasper & V.A.O.Dittrich

G
Blechnum gemmascens Alston = Parablechnum gemmascens (Alston) Gasper & Salino
Blechnum geniculatum T.C.Chambers & P.A.Farrant = Cranfillia geniculata (T.C.Chambers & P.A.Farrant) Gasper & V.A.O.Dittrich
Blechnum ghiesbreghtii (Baker) C.Chr. = Austroblechnum stoloniferum (Mett. ex E.Fourn.) Gasper & V.A.O.Dittrich
Blechnum gibbum (Labill.) Mett. = Oceaniopteris gibba (Labill.) Gasper & Salino
Blechnum glabrescens T.C.Chambers & Sykes = Cranfillia glabrescens (T.C.Chambers & Sykes) Gasper & V.A.O.Dittrich
Blechnum glaziovii (Christ) Rolleri & Prada = Parablechnum glaziovii (Christ) Gasper & Salino
Blechnum gregsonii (Watts) Tindale = Parablechnum gregsonii (Tindale) Gasper & Salino

H
Blechnum hancockii Hance = Struthiopteris hancockii (Hance) Tagawa
Blechnum hieronymi Brause = Parablechnum hieronymi (Brause) Gasper & Salino
Blechnum hindii (Tindale ex T.C.Chambers) Christenh. = Doodia hindii Tindale ex T.C.Chambers
Blechnum hirsutum Rosenst. = Cranfillia hirsuta (Rosenst.) Gasper & V.A.O.Dittrich
Blechnum howeanum T.C.Chambers & P.A.Farrant = Parablechnum howeanum (T.C.Chambers & P.A.Farrant) Gasper & Salino
Blechnum humbertii Tardieu = Parablechnum marginatum (Fée) Gasper & Salino var. humbertii (Tardieu) Gasper & Salino

I–K
Blechnum inflexum (Kunze) Kuhn = Lomaria inflexa Kunze
Blechnum insigne (Hook.) C.M.Kuo = Brainea insignis (Hook.) J.Sm.
Blechnum integrifrons Bonap. ex Rakotondr. = Austroblechnum integrifrons (Bonap. ex Rakotondr.) Gasper & V.A.O.Dittrich
Blechnum jamaicense C.Chr. = Austroblechnum jamaicense (Broadh.) Gasper & V.A.O.Dittrich
Blechnum keysseri Rosenst. = Austroblechnum keysseri (Rosenst.) Gasper & V.A.O.Dittrich

L
Blechnum lechleri Mett. = Austroblechnum lechleri (T.Moore) Gasper & V.A.O.Dittrich
Blechnum lehmannii Hieron. = Austroblechnum lehmannii (Hieron.) Gasper & V.A.O.Dittrich
Blechnum lenormandii (Baker) Diels = Diploblechnum lenormandii (Baker) Gasper & V.A.O.Dittrich
Blechnum leyboldtianum C.Chr. = Austroblechnum leyboldtianum (Phil.) Gasper & V.A.O.Dittrich
Blechnum lherminieri (Bory) Mett. = Austroblechnum lherminieri (Bory) Gasper & V.A.O.Dittrich
Blechnum lima Rosenst. = Parablechnum lima (Rosenst.) Gasper & Salino
Blechnum lineare (C.Moore & J.Sm.) Christenh. = Doodia linearis C.Moore ex J.Sm.
Blechnum lineatum (Sw.) Hieron. = Parablechnum lineatum (Sw.) Gasper & Salino
Blechnum longepetiolatum Tardieu = Lomariocycas longepetiolata (Tardieu) Gasper & A.R.Sm.
Blechnum longicauda C.Chr. = Cranfillia longicauda (C.Chr.) Gasper & V.A.O.Dittrich
Blechnum longipinna Rakotondr. = Lomariocycas longipinna (Rakotondr.) Gasper & A.R.Sm.
Blechnum longistipitatum A.Rojas = Parablechnum longistipitatum (A.Rojas) comb. ined.
Blechnum loxense (Kunth) Hook. ex Salomon = Parablechnum loxense (Kunth) Gasper & Salino
Blechnum lyonii (O.Deg.) Christenh. = Doodia lyonii O.Deg.

M
Blechnum madagascariense Tardieu = Lomariocycas madagascariensis (Tardieu) Gasper & A.R.Sm.
Blechnum magellanicum (Desv.) Mett. = Lomariocycas magellanica (Desv.) Gasper & A.R.Sm.
Blechnum marginatum Kuhn = Parablechnum marginatum (Fée) Gasper & Salino
Blechnum marquesense (E.D.Br.) Christenh. = Doodia marquesensis E.D.Br.
Blechnum maximum (R.Br. ex C.Chr.) Christenh. = Doodia maxima (R.Br.) J.Sm.
Blechnum maxonii C.Chr. = Austroblechnum lehmannii (Hieron.) Gasper & V.A.O.Dittrich
Blechnum medium (R.Br.) Christenh. = Doodia media R.Br.
Blechnum melanocaulon (Brack.) T.C.Chambers & P.A.Farrant = Austroblechnum melanocaulon (Brack.) Gasper & V.A.O.Dittrich
Blechnum melanopus Hook. = Blechnidium melanopus (Hook.) T.Moore
Blechnum membranaceum (Colenso) Mett. = Austroblechnum membranaceum (Colenso ex Hook.) Gasper & V.A.O.Dittrich
Blechnum microphyllum (Goldm.) C.V.Morton = Austroblechnum microphyllum (Goldm.) Gasper & V.A.O.Dittrich
Blechnum milnei (Carruth.) C.Chr. = Parablechnum milnei (Carruth.) Gasper & Salino
Blechnum minus (R.Br.) Ettingsh. = Parablechnum minus (R.Br.) Gasper & Salino
Blechnum mochaenum G.Kunkel = Austroblechnum lechleri (T.Moore) Gasper & V.A.O.Dittrich
Blechnum molle (Parris) Christenh. = Doodia mollis Parris
Blechnum monomorphum R.C.Moran & B.Øllg. = Parablechnum monomorphum (R.C.Moran & B. Øllg.) Gasper & Salino
Blechnum montanum T.C.Chambers & P.A.Farrant = Parablechnum montanum (T.C.Chambers & P.A.Farrant) Gasper & Salino
Blechnum moorei C.Chr. = Oceaniopteris ciliata (T.Moore) Gasper & Salino
Blechnum moranianum A.Rojas = Parablechnum moranianum (A.Rojas) Gasper & Salino
Blechnum moritzianum (Klotzsch) Hieron. = Lomariocycas moritziana (Klotzsch) Gabriel y Galán & Vicent

N
Blechnum neglectum (F.M.Bailey) R.K.Wilson & Bayly = Diploblechnum neglectum (F.M.Bailey) Gasper & V.A.O.Dittrich
Blechnum neohollandicum Christenh. = Doodia aspera R.Br.
Blechnum nesophilum T.C.Chambers & P.A.Farrant = Parablechnum nesophilum (T.C.Chambers & P.A.Farrant) Gasper & Salino
Blechnum nigrocostatum A.Rojas = Lomaridium nigrocostatum (A.Rojas) Gasper & V.A.O.Dittrich
Blechnum nigrum (Colenso) Mett. = Cranfillia nigra (Colenso) Gasper & V.A.O.Dittrich
Blechnum norfolkianum (Heward) Maiden = Austroblechnum norfolkianum (Heward) Gasper & V.A.O.Dittrich
Blechnum novae-zelandiae T.C.Chambers & P.A.Farrant = Parablechnum novae-zelandiae (T.C.Chambers & P.A.Farrant) Gasper & Salino
Blechnum nudum (Labill.) Wakef. = Lomaria nuda (Labill.) Willd.
Blechnum nukuhivense E.Brown = Austroblechnum nukuhivense (E.D.Br.) Gasper & V.A.O.Dittrich

O
Blechnum obtusatum (Labill.) Mett. = Oceaniopteris obtusata (Labill.) Gasper & Salino
Blechnum obtusum R.C.Moran & A.R.Sm. = Parablechnum obtusum (R.C.Moran & A.R.Sm.) Gasper & Salino
Blechnum oceanicum (Rosenst.) Brownlie = Lomaria oceanica (Rosenst.) Gasper & V.A.O.Dittrich
Blechnum opacum Mett. = Cranfillia opaca (Mett.) Gasper & V.A.O.Dittrich
Blechnum organense Brade = Austroblechnum organense (Brade) Gasper & V.A.O.Dittrich
Blechnum orientale L. = Blechnopsis orientalis (L.) C.Presl

P–Q
Blechnum pacificum Lorence & A.R.Sm. = Parablechnum pacificum (Lorence & A.R.Sm.) Gasper & Salino
Blechnum pallidum (Hook. & Arn.) Brack. = Sadleria pallida Hook. & Arn.
Blechnum palmiforme (Thouars) C.Chr. = Lomariocycas palmiformis (Thouars) Gasper & A.R.Sm.
Blechnum parrisiae Christenh. = Doodia australis (Parris) Parris
Blechnum paschale (C.Chr.) Christenh. = Doodia paschalis C.Chr.
Blechnum patersonii (R.Br.) Mett. = Austroblechnum patersonii (R.Br.) Gasper & V.A.O.Dittrich
Blechnum pazense M.Kessler & A.R.Sm. = Parablechnum pazense (M.Kessler & A.R.Sm.) Gasper & Salino
Blechnum penna-marina (Poir.) Kuhn = Austroblechnum penna-marina (Poir.) Gasper & V.A.O.Dittrich
Blechnum petiolare C.Chr. = Austroblechnum lehmannii (Hieron.) Gasper & V.A.O.Dittrich
Blechnum pilosum (Brack.) Brownlie = Cranfillia pilosa (Brack.) Gasper & V.A.O.Dittrich
Blechnum pinnatifidum A.Rojas = Austroblechnum pinnatifidum (A.Rojas) Gasper & V.A.O.Dittrich
Blechnum polinesicum Molinari = Doodia scaberula Parris
Blechnum procerum (G.Forst.) Sw. = Parablechnum procerum (G.Forst.) C.Presl
Blechnum proliferum Rosenst. = Parablechnum proliferum (Rosenst.) Gasper & Salino
Blechnum pteropus (Kunze) Mett. = Lomaridium pteropus (Kunze) Gasper & V.A.O.Dittrich
Blechnum puniceum T.C.Chambers, P.J.Edwards & R.J.Johns = Parablechnum puniceum (T.C.Chambers, P.J.Edwards & R.J.Johns) Gasper & Salino

R
Blechnum raiateense J.W.Moore = Austroblechnum raiateense (J.W.Moore) Gasper & V.A.O.Dittrich
Blechnum reflexum Rosenst. ex M.Kessler & A.R.Sm. = Parablechnum reflexum (Rosenst. ex M.Kessler & A.R.Sm.) Gasper & Salino
Blechnum repens M.Kessler & A.R.Sm. = Parablechnum repens (M.Kessler & A.R.Sm.) Gasper & Salino
Blechnum reticulatum R.K.Wilson & Bayly = Diploblechnum acuminatum (C.T.White & Goy) Gasper & V.A.O.Dittrich
Blechnum revolutum (Alderw.) C.Chr. = Parablechnum revolutum (Alderw.) Gasper & Salino
Blechnum rheophyticum R.C.Moran = Parablechnum rheophyticum (R.C.Moran) Gasper & Salino
Blechnum rimbachii C.Chr. = Austroblechnum divergens (Kunze) Gasper & V.A.O.Dittrich
Blechnum × rodriguezii S.Aguiar, L.G.Quintan. & Amigo = Austroblechnum × rodriguezii (Aguiar, L.G.Quintan. & Amigo) Gasper & V.A.O.Dittrich
Blechnum rosenstockii Copel. = Diploblechnum rosenstockii (Copel.) Gasper & V.A.O.Dittrich
Blechnum rufum (Spreng.) C.Chr. = Lomariocycas rufa (Spreng.) Gasper & A.R.Sm.
Blechnum ryanii (Kaulf.) Hieron. = Parablechnum ryanii (Kaulf.) Gasper & Salino

S
Blechnum sampaioanum Brade = Cranfillia sampaioana (Brade) Gasper & V.A.O.Dittrich
Blechnum schiedeanum (Schltdl. ex C.Presl) Hieron. = Parablechnum schiedeanum (Schltdl. ex C.Presl) Gasper & Salino
Blechnum schomburgkii (Klotzsch) C.Chr. = Lomariocycas schomburgkii (Klotzsch) Gasper & A.R.Sm.
Blechnum schottii (Colla) C.Chr. = Lomaridium schottii (Colla) Gasper & V.A.O.Dittrich
Blechnum sessilifolium (Klotzsch ex Christ) C.Chr. = Parablechnum sessilifolium (Klotzsch ex Christ) Gasper & Salino
Blechnum shaferi (Broadh.) C.Chr. = Lomariocycas shaferi (Broadh.) Gasper & A.R.Sm.
Blechnum smilodon M.Kessler & Lehnert = Parablechnum smilodon (M.Kessler & Lehnert) Gasper & Salino
Blechnum spannagelii Rosenst. = Lomaria spannagelii (Rosenst.) Gasper & V.A.O.Dittrich
Blechnum spicant (L.) Roth = Struthiopteris spicant (L.) Weiss
Blechnum spinulosum Poir. = Doodia caudata (Cav.) R.Br.
Blechnum sprucei C.Chr. = Cranfillia caudata (Baker) V.A.O.Dittrich & Gasper
Blechnum squamatum M.Kessler & A.R.Sm. = Parablechnum squamatum (M.Kessler & A.R.Sm.) Gasper & Salino
Blechnum squamipes (Hieron.) M.Kessler & A.R.Sm. = Austroblechnum squamipes (Hieron.) Gasper & V.A.O.Dittrich
Blechnum squamosissimum A.Rojas = Parablechnum squamosissimum (A.Rojas) Gasper & Salino
Blechnum squarrosum Gaudich. = Doodia squarrosa Colenso
Blechnum stipitellatum (Sodiro) C.Chr. = Parablechnum stipitellatum (Sodiro) Gasper & Salino
Blechnum stuebelii Hieron. = Parablechnum stuebelii (Hieron.) Gasper & Salino
Blechnum subcordatum (E.Fourn.) Brownlie = Parablechnum subcordatum (E.Fourn.) Gasper & Salino

T–V
Blechnum tabulare (Thunb.) Kuhn = Lomariocycas tabularis (Thunb.) Gasper & A.R.Sm.
Blechnum triangularifolium T.C.Chambers & P.A.Farrant = Parablechnum triangularifolium (T.C.Chambers & P.A.Farrant) Gasper & Salino
Blechnum tuerckheimii Brause = Parablechnum tuerckheimii (Brause) Gasper & Salino
Blechnum underwoodianum (Broadh.) C.Chr. = Lomariocycas insularis (C.V.Morton & Lellinger) Gasper & A.R.Sm.
Blechnum unisorum (Baker) Christenh. = Sadleria unisora (Baker) Rob.
Blechnum usterianum (Christ) C.Chr. = Parablechnum usterianum (Christ) Gasper & Salino
Blechnum vallegrandense M.Kessler & A.R.Sm. = Austroblechnum vallegrandense (M.Kessler & A.R.Sm.) Gasper & V.A.O.Dittrich
Blechnum venosum Copel. = Parablechnum venosum (Copel.) Gasper & Salino
Blechnum vestitum (Blume) Kuhn = Parablechnum vestitum (Blume) Gasper & Salino
Blechnum vieillardii Mett. = Austroblechnum vieillardii (Mett.) Gasper & V.A.O.Dittrich
Blechnum vittatum Brack. = Oceaniopteris vittata (Brack.) Gasper & Salino
Blechnum vulcanicum (Blume) Kuhn = Cranfillia vulcanica (Blume) Gasper & V.A.O.Dittrich
Blechnum wagnerianum (D.D.Palmer & T.Flynn) Christenh. = Sadleria wagneriana D.D.Palmer & Flynn

W–Z
Blechnum wardiae Mickel & Beitel = Austroblechnum wardiae (Mickel & Beitel) Gasper & V.A.O.Dittrich
Blechnum wattsii Tindale = Parablechnum wattsii (Tindale) Gasper & Salino
Blechnum werckleanum (Christ) C.Chr. = Lomariocycas werckleana (Christ) Gasper & A.R.Sm.
Blechnum werffii R.C.Moran = Parablechnum werffii (R.C.Moran) Gasper & Salino
Blechnum whelanii F.M.Bailey = Oceaniopteris whelanii (F.M.Bailey) Gasper & Salino
Blechnum wolamense Cuf. = Lomariocycas tabularis (Thunb.) Gasper & A.R.Sm.
Blechnum wurunuran Parris = Parablechnum wurunuran (Parris) Gasper & Salino
Blechnum xiphophyllum (Baker) C.Chr. = Lomaridium xiphophyllum (Baker) Gasper & V.A.O.Dittrich
Blechnum zeelandicum Christenh. = Doodia squarrosa Colenso

References

Blechnaceae
Blechnum